Pyrene is a polycyclic aromatic hydrocarbon (PAH) consisting of four fused benzene rings, resulting in a flat aromatic system. This yellow solid is the smallest peri-fused PAH (one where the rings are fused through more than one face). Pyrene forms during incomplete combustion of organic compounds.

Occurrence and properties
Pyrene was first isolated from coal tar, where it occurs up to 2% by weight.  As a peri-fused PAH, pyrene is much more resonance-stabilized than its five-member-ring containing isomer fluoranthene.  Therefore, it is produced in a wide range of combustion conditions.  For example, automobiles produce about 1 μg/km.

Reactions
Oxidation with chromate affords perinaphthenone and then naphthalene-1,4,5,8-tetracarboxylic acid. Pyrene undergoes a series of hydrogenation reactions and is susceptible to halogenation, Diels-Alder additions, and nitration, all with varying degrees of selectivity.  Bromination occurs at one of the 3-positions.

Reduction with sodium affords the radical anion. From this anion, a variety of pi-arene complexes can be prepared.

Photophysics

Pyrene and its derivatives are used commercially to make dyes and dye precursors, for example pyranine and naphthalene-1,4,5,8-tetracarboxylic acid. It has strong absorbance in UV-Vis  in three sharp bands at 330 nm in DCM. The emission is close to the absorption, but moving at 375 nm.  The morphology of the signals change with the solvent. Its derivatives are also valuable molecular probes via fluorescence spectroscopy, having a high quantum yield and lifetime (0.65 and 410 nanoseconds, respectively, in ethanol at 293 K).  Pyrene was the first molecule for which excimer behavior was discovered. Such excimer appears around 450 nm.  Theodor Förster reported this in 1954.

Applications

Pyrene's fluorescence emission spectrum is very sensitive to solvent polarity, so pyrene has been used as a probe to determine solvent environments. This is due to its excited state having a different, non-planar structure than the ground state. Certain emission bands are unaffected, but others vary in intensity due to the strength of interaction with a solvent.

Pyrenes are strong electron donor materials and can be combined with several materials in order to make electron donor-acceptor systems which can be used in energy conversion and light harvesting applications.

Safety and environmental factors
Although it is not as problematic as benzopyrene, animal studies have shown pyrene is toxic to the kidneys and liver. It is now known that pyrene affects several living functions in fish and algae.

Its biodegradation has been heavily examined.  The process commences with dihydroxylation at each of two kinds of CH=CH linkages. Experiments in pigs show that urinary 1-hydroxypyrene is a metabolite of pyrene, when given orally.

See also
 List of interstellar and circumstellar molecules
 Perhydropyrene

References

Further reading
 
 
 
 

Pyrenes
Polycyclic aromatic hydrocarbons
PBT substances